The 2016 season was Hammarby Fotboll's 101st in existence, their 47th season in Allsvenskan and their 2nd consecutive season in the league. They competed in Allsvenskan and Svenska Cupen during the year. League play started in early April and lasted until early November. Nanne Bergstrand made his third season as manager.

Summary
The team had a strong run in the 2015-16 Svenska Cupen. They won against Djurgårdens IF in the group stage, before eliminating their other local rival AIK in the quarter finals after a penalty shoot-out. Eventually Hammarby lost in the semi final against BK Häcken, finishing joint third in the tournament.

However, during the first half of the league play Hammarby struggled in their fixtures, only winning 3 of the 15 games. One of the few highlights were the performances of midfielder Erik Israelsson who managed to score 8 goals during the same period.

Mid through the campaign, manager Nanne Bergstrand chose to swap the two central defenders, with youngster Joseph Aidoo and newly signed David Boo Wiklander making their entrances as regular starters. Out of the following 11 games Hammarby won an impressive 7 – also keeping a clean sheet in 6 consecutive away fixtures. Boo Wiklander was later voted player of the year by the club's supporters.

During the end of the season, Hammarby struggled to stay in the new found mid regions of the table, losing 3 out of the 4 last fixtures. Eventually the club, to some disappointingly, finished 11th in Allsvenskan. However, on match day 26, Hammarby managed to beat local rivals Djurgården in a spectacular derby fixture. The Brazilian striker Rômulo scored a hat-trick while securing a 4-2 win for his side.

In the off-season, on 18 November, the board chose to sack manager Nanne Bergstrand, citing "a need to get a new voice and new energy into the club's sporting development".

Players

Squad information

Transfers

In

Out

Player statistics

Appearances and goals

Disciplinary record

Club

Coaching staff

Other information

Pre-season and friendlies

Friendlies

Competitions

Overall

Allsvenskan

League table

Results summary

Results by round

Matches
Kickoff times are in (UTC+01) unless stated otherwise.

Svenska Cupen

2015–16
The tournament continues from the 2015 season.

Kickoff times are in UTC+1.

Group stage

Knockout stage

2016–17
The tournament continues into the 2017 season.

Qualification stage

Footnotes

Hammarby Fotboll seasons
Hammarby Fotboll